Willink van Collenprijs (English: The Willink van Collen Award) is a former Dutch art award, which was awarded for the first time in 1880 by the Sociëteit Arti et Amicitiae. It was intended as an encouragement award for young artists, and was considered as a national counterpart to the Paris Salon. Its existence of more than 71 years proves the success of Amsterdam's art policy . For many of its winners, it was a valuable boost to their careers in the Dutch art world. Some of the prize winners were also recognized abroad and remain well known today.

Background 
During the "Second Golden Age of Dutch painting", the Dutch painters enjoyed considerable arts patronage from the upper class. This can also be seen in the context of the Hague School and the School of Allebé.

The Amsterdam-born painter Wilhem Ferdinand Willink van Collen (1847–1881) and his wife Anna Weber-van Bosse were great art lovers. After his death, he bequeathed a sum of 30,000 guilders to the society Arti et Amicitiae to set up a trust fund. The aim was to support young artists' income during their difficult initial phase. This also happened at painter's schools like Düsseldorf painter's School, Copenhagen School, Weimar Saxon-Grand Ducal Art School, the Munich School, Academy of Beaux-Arts to Paris, Accademia di Belle Arti di Firenze as well as the Barbizon School and the new French Impressionism to give a chance to the Dutch young generation, too.

The annual art exhibition of the Paris Salon was the most important event, too. It was the centre of the painters of Europe and it was very difficult to be allowed to exhibit there. The Five prizes awarded there were highly desired. It concerned two Gold Medals (medals of the 1st class) and three Silver Medals (medals of the 2nd class). Moreover, "Recognitions" and "Honorable Mentions" were pronounced. All this needed an answer in the Netherlands.

The board of Directors of the Association "Arti et Amiticitae" decided to hold an annual painting competition for all Dutch artists. Participants were required to reside in the Netherlands, and be under the age of 30. Later, the age limit was raised to 35. The paintings were submitted unsigned, and evaluated by the jury anonymously. Originally, there was a first place, a second place and a third one, a commendation – structured like the prizes of the Paris Salon. Not every prize was awarded every year. This approach was maintained until 1893. The jury had to deal with a problem of a special kind. The standard of entries was quite staggering. In 1891 it was decided to select a more difficult theme, to deter painters with inadequate training.

The following year, the jury decided to award no first prize. The reason was: It was felt that "no sufficient artistic value" was presented in the submitted works.

No award and its consequences 

In 1893, a competition to design a mural for the organizers' building was announced. Only seven submissions were received, all of which disappointed the jury. For the first time in the history of the award, neither the prize nor the commendation were awarded. In 1894, the executive board decided to proceed differently. Instead of awarding the prize, the award money was spent on acquiring the painting "The Snow" by George Hendrik Breitner, a study trip for three Rijksacademie of Amsterdam students, and a small scholarship for Dutch artists living in London.

This decision upset both painters and the general public. This must be seen in the contemporary social context, because the Willink van Collenprijs had become a national institution. 
As a consequence, a petition to protest this practice was signed by 29 artists, including famous names like Hendrik Willem Mesdag, the brothers Jacob and Willem Maris, Paul Gabriël and Louis Apol. Giving in to the pressure, a competition was organized again in 1896. According to the new rules, there would only be a first prize, and no other places. In the years 1897, 1906, 1909 and 1910, multiple "first prizes" were awarded.

Because of political events, the award could not be written out consistently. After 71 years, it was awarded for the last time in 1950.

Some themes 

Selected topics were expressed
 Among Friends – (1880),
 Genre scene from the Dutch family – (1884),
 Animal piece – (1886),
 Townscape – (1888),
 Figure Painting – (1889),
 A landscape upholstered – (1890),
 In the head – (1891),
 An event in the national history – (1892),
 Flat mural – (1893),
 River face – (1917),
 The life of Willem Zwijger – (1932)
 Summer – (1935).

List of winners

Winners 1880–1893 
1880 Nicolaas van der Waay
1881 no first place
1882 Ernst Witkamp
1883 Jan Hillebrand Wijsmuller
1884 Wally Moes
1885 Jan Hoynck van Papendrecht
1886 Jan Voerman
1887 Henry Luyten
1888 Willem Bastiaan Tholen
1889 Johannes Evert Hendrik Akkeringa
1890 Johannes Graadt van Roggen
1891 no first place
1892 no first place
1893 no prize

Winners from 1896–1950 
1896 Marius Bauer
1897 Minca Bosch Reitz, Theo Molkenboer, Johan Vlaanderen
1898 Gerrit Haverkamp
1904 Hendrik Jan Wolter
1905 Cornelis Vreedenburgh
1906 Barend Polvliet, Lizzy Ansingh
1909 Johann Georg van Caspel, Chris van der Hoef, Georg Rueter, David Schulman
1910 Elsa Woutersen-van Doesburgh, Marie van Hove, Bernard van Beek, Ed Gerdes
1913 Gerard Johan Staller
1914 Salomon Garf
1917 Nicolas Friedrich Heinrich Cevat
1937 Helena Elisabeth Goudeket
1939 Theo Kurpershoek
1946 Jacob (Jaap) Visser
1950 Henk Willemse

Gallery of the most prize winners

Notes

References

Bibliography 
 Britta Bley: Vom Staat zur Nation: Zur Rolle der Kunst bei der Herausbildung eines Niederländischen Nationalbewußtseins im langen 19. Jahrhundert. LIT-Verlag, Münster 2004, .
De Bodt, Saskia and Sellink, Manfred. Nineteenth Century Dutch Watercolors and Drawings, Museum Boijmans Van Beuningen, Rotterdam, 1998.
 De Leeuw, Ronald et al. The Hague School Dutch Masters of the 19th Century (1983)
Sillevis, John, Dutch Drawings From the Age of Van Gogh, Taft Museum, Cincinnati, Ohio, 1992.
Sillevis, John and Tabak, Anne, The Hague School Book, Waanders Uitgegevers, Zwolle, 2004.
 Suyver, Renske. A Reflection of Holland: The Best of the Hague School in the Rijksmuseum (2011)
Müllerschön, Bernd and Maier, Thomas, Die Maler der Schule von Barbizon – Wegbereiter des Impressionismus, Stuttgart, Ed. Thombe, 2002 
 Lévêque, Jean-Jaques: L'AUBE DE IMPRESSIONNISME – 1848–1869, ACR, Édition Internationale, Courbevoie, Paris, 2000, 
 Imanse, Geurt: Van Gogh bis Cobra: holländische Malerei 1880–1950. Hatje, 1980, .

External links 

 Hague School
 Ausstellung "Malerei der Haager Schule" (German)
 Late Hague School
 Mesdag und die "Haager Schule" Dissertation Gabriele Schmid "Illusionsräume" (German)

Dutch painting
Realism (art movement)
Impressionism
Hague School
Modernism
Dutch artist groups and collectives